Papa Kahte Hain ( is a 1996 Indian Hindi romance film directed by Mahesh Bhatt. The film starred Jugal Hansraj and Mayuri Kango, with Tiku Talsania, Anupam Kher and Alok Nath in supporting roles.

Plot
Sweety lives with her mother, maternal grandmother and grandfather. She is very rebellious, emotional and high-strung, and does not get along well with her classmates in school. All she knows is that she is not permitted to talk about her dad at home. She finds out that he is in the Seychelles and runs away there.

When she gets to the Seychelles, she can't find her dad, whom she has been so anxious to meet. One link is the death of marine archaeologist, Mr. Gandhibhai, who only knows where her dad is. Coincidentally, her dad is in the same hotel which she is in. He is living with another woman, Swati Sinha, who had divorced another male. Her dad is not at all thrilled to have a teenage daughter come and interrupt his life and affairs. In the Seychelles, Sweety meets Rohit Dixit and they fall in love with each other. Mr. Anand and Sweety have developed a father-daughter relationship, unaware to the fact that they are related. Later, the story has several twists, which ultimately ends on a happy note.

Cast
 Jugal Hansraj as Rohit Dixit
 Dinesh Hingoo as Rustom
 Mayuri Kango as Sweety Anand
 Anupam Kher as Krishan Anand
 Navni Parihar as Vinita Gandhi /Anand
 Suhas Joshi as Mrs. Gandhi
 Tiku Talsania as Taraknath Gandhi
 Suhasini Mulay
 Alok Nath
 Reema Lagoo

Soundtrack
The music of this movie was huge hit, especially Ghar Se Nikalte hi, Pyar Mein Hota Hai Kya Jaadu, Pehle Pyar Ka Pehla Gham, Yeh Jo Thode Se Hai Paise.
The music was composed by Rajesh Roshan. The lyrics were penned by Javed Akhtar. The song "Ghar Se Nikalte Hi" is based on from "Kaliveedurangiyallo" from Desadanam.

References

External links

1996 films
1990s Hindi-language films
Films scored by Rajesh Roshan
Films directed by Mahesh Bhatt
Indian comedy films
Films set in Seychelles
1996 comedy films
Hindi-language comedy films